André Göransson and Nathaniel Lammons were the defending champions but chose not to defend their title.

Evan King and Julian Lenz won the title after defeating Karol Drzewiecki and Sergio Martos Gornés 3–6, 6–3, [11–9] in the final.

Seeds

Draw

References

 Main draw

Biella Challenger VI - Doubles